George Leopold Bryan (1828 – 29 June 1880) was an Irish politician in the United Kingdom House of Commons.

He was elected to the United Kingdom House of Commons as Member of Parliament for County Kilkenny in 1865, and held the seat until 1880.

References

1828 births
1880 deaths
Members of the Parliament of the United Kingdom for County Kilkenny constituencies (1801–1922)
UK MPs 1865–1868
UK MPs 1868–1874
UK MPs 1874–1880